The Nethercutt-Richards family is an American family prominent in the fields of cars and business.

Notable members 
 Merle Norman (1887-1972) - founder of Merle Norman Cosmetics
 J.B. Nethercutt (1913-2004) - founder of The Nethercutt Collection
 Jack Nethercutt II (born 1936) - former racing driver
 Helen Richards-Nethercutt (born 1952) - autism awareness activist

Cars 
The family has over 250 prestigious and exotic vehicles housed mostly at the 10 story-tall Nethercutt Collection complex founded and primarily assembled by J.B. Nethercutt. It has been widely considered as one of the greatest collections in the world by several media publications. The car collection notably contains the famous Bugatti Dubos and the Twenty Grand Duesenberg. 

The collection holds the most Best of Show titles at the Pebble Beach Concours d'Elegance with 6 victories. Jack Nethercutt II raced professionally from the 1950s to 1960s, most notably in the World Sportscar Championship series.

Business 
Merle Norman founded Merle Norman Cosmetics in 1931 by opening her first studio in Santa Monica, California. The company expanded to a retail chain and encompassed dozens of studio outlets across the contiguous United States, most of which were owned by women. The company further expanded to thousands of outlets throughout North America, Europe, and Asia becoming a centi-million dollar operation. In 1969, the company went public on the American Stock Exchange and sold 400,000 shares at $25. In 1974, the family bought back all the public stock and the company reverted to being privately held.

They owned an independent chemistry laboratory in the 1970s and a luxury restaurant near the Las Vegas Strip in the 1990s.

Philanthropy 
The family has donated several million to charities, medical institutions, veterans, and churches. In 1985 J.B. Nethercutt donated $1 million to the town of Kenora, Canada for a new emergency department. In 1986, the family donated several million which led to the construction of the six-story Merle Norman Pavilion at the UCLA Medical Center, Santa Monica. In 2007 the Nethercutt Emergency Center was opened at the hospital. Helen Richards-Nethercutt has funded research for autism programs. They have donated to the University of Southern California.

Historic Estates 

 Merle Norman House (built 1935), Mediterranean Revival ocean view estate in Santa Monica, California that became a Santa Monica Historic Landmark.
 San Sylmar (built 1971), Art Deco tower estate in Sylmar, Los Angeles that was one of the largest houses in the United States at 60,000 square feet.

References

External links 
 The Nethercutt Collection

American families
Business families of the United States